Islom Inomov (born 30 May 1984) is an Uzbekistani football player (defender) who most recently played for Olmaliq FK.

Career
He started his career at FK Buxoro. Until 2004 he played for Pakhtakor when, for the 2004 league season, he signed for Navbahor Namangan. Inomov and is also a member of the Uzbekistan national football team. He was called up for 2010 FIFA World Cup qualification (AFC) games and participated in the 2007 AFC Asian Cup.

In 2012–13 he played for Lokomotiv Tashkent. On 14 March 2014 he signed a contract with Bunyodkor

In February 2015 he moved to Olmaliq FK, signing a one-year contract with that club.

Honors
Pakhtakor
 Uzbek League (3): 2004, 2006, 2007
 Uzbek Cup (4): 2004, 2006, 2007, 2008

Bunyodkor
 Uzbek League (1): 2011

Lokomotiv
 Uzbek League runner-up (1): 2013
 Uzbek Super Cup runner-up (1): 2013

Career statistics

Club

International
Goals for Senior National Team

References

External links

Living people
1984 births
People from Angren, Uzbekistan
Uzbekistani footballers
Uzbekistani Muslims
Uzbekistan international footballers
2004 AFC Asian Cup players
2007 AFC Asian Cup players
Pakhtakor Tashkent FK players
Navbahor Namangan players
FC Bunyodkor players
FC Lokomotivi Tbilisi players
Expatriate footballers in Georgia (country)
Expatriate footballers in China
Uzbekistani expatriate sportspeople in China
Chinese Super League players
Liaoning F.C. players
Buxoro FK players
FC AGMK players
Footballers at the 2006 Asian Games
Association football fullbacks
Asian Games competitors for Uzbekistan